Live in Chicago, or Official Bootleg: Live in Chicago, June 28, 2017, is a live album by the English progressive rock band King Crimson, released through Discipline Global Mobile records on 14 October 2017. The album was recorded on 28 June at the Chicago Theatre in Chicago, Illinois during the band's 2017 United States tour. It is the first full-length release by the eight-piece incarnation of the band and features new songs and rearrangements of compositions mostly from the early 1970s.

The performance
For the American leg of King Crimson's 2017 tour, the band was composed of three drummers, two guitarists, a bassist, a keyboardist, and a saxophonist/flautist – a lineup known as the "double quartet". Much of the performance is made up of old King Crimson material rearranged to fit the band's new format. Founding King Crimson member Robert Fripp said about the performance, "If we are looking for a KC live show; Chicago was exceptional," and bassist Tony Levin called the show "one of our best."

Critical reception

Live in Chicago received positive reviews. Writing for All About Jazz, John Kelman praised the album extensively, writing that it "is not just another superb entry in a series of fine live recordings from this current—and soon to be longest-lasting—edition of King Crimson. It's also reason enough, even for those who've seen the band many times since 2014, to make catching King Crimson on its next return to their neck of the woods a most definite slam dunk." Chris Roberts of Team Rock lauded the performances, saying the encore of "Heroes" was earned. The Spill Magazine critic Aaron Badgley wrote, "It is almost like a whole new album by King Crimson. This is an excellent live album, and an example of how good live albums can be."

Track listing

Notes
 "The Court of the Crimson King" was printed on the night's setlist but was not performed.
 On the setlist, "The Errors" was titled "Radical Action III".
 This show marked the first recording of "The Errors", though it was performed throughout the American leg of the summer 2017 tour starting in Seattle.

Personnel
King Crimson
 Robert Fripp – guitar, keyboards, liner notes
 Tony Levin – bass, Chapman Stick, voice, photography
 Gavin Harrison – drums
 Pat Mastelotto – drums
 Jeremy Stacey – drums, keyboards
 Jakko Jakszyk – guitar, flute, voice
 Bill Rieflin – keyboards
 Mel Collins – saxophone, flute

Additional personnel
 David Singleton – photography, liner notes, production, mastering
 Chris Porter – mixing

References

External links
Tony Levin's diary entry for the Chicago show

2017 live albums
King Crimson live albums
Discipline Global Mobile albums